"She Got It" is the debut single by American rapper 2 Pistols from his debut album Death Before Dishonor. The song features T-Pain and Tay Dizm and was produced by J.U.S.T.I.C.E. League. There is also an original version produced by long-time friend Bolo da Producer. "She Got It" reached number 24 on the Billboard Hot 100, number 9 on Hot R&B/Hip-Hop Songs, and number 2 on the Hot Rap Tracks chart.

Music video
The song's music video features an appearance by Jay Lyriq and Sophia Fresh, who makes a cameo during Tay Dizm's verse.

Remix
The official remix, "She Got It (J.U.S.T.I.C.E. League Remix)", features T-Pain, Twista, and Lil' Kim. Lil Flip also recorded a freestyle version of the song called "We Got It" which can be heard on his MySpace profile.

Charts

Weekly charts

Year-end charts

Release history

References

2008 debut singles
2008 songs
T-Pain songs
Songs written by T-Pain
Songs written by Erik Ortiz
Songs written by Kevin Crowe
Song recordings produced by J.U.S.T.I.C.E. League
Universal Republic Records singles